Today is an Australian television series which aired from 1960 to 1961 on Melbourne station GTV-9. Originally hosted by Barry McQueen, most episodes were hosted by Hal Todd. It was a morning series aired at 7:30AM, and running for 60 minutes (90 minutes on Saturdays). It included news, weather and exercise instruction. Following the end of the series, Hal Todd began hosting Toddy Time. Following the end of the series, GTV-9 stopped offering morning programming for several years. Previously, it had aired In Melbourne Today in a morning time-slot on Saturdays from 1957 to 1958.

Reception
Reviewing the first two episodes, The Age gave it a mixed review, saying that "Today showed some entertaining segments" but also stated that "Today didn't flow as smoothly as such programmes are required to flow".

References

External links
Today on IMDb

Nine Network original programming
Breakfast television in Australia
1960 Australian television series debuts
1961 Australian television series endings
Black-and-white Australian television shows
English-language television shows
Australian non-fiction television series